Five Tribes can refer to:
 Five Tribes (board game)
 Five Civilized Tribes